ARMM Regional Assembly, also known as ARMM Regional Legislative Assembly (Pangrehiyong Kapulungang Pambatasan ng ARMM), was the devolved unicameral regional legislature of the Autonomous Region in Muslim Mindanao (ARMM). It was known as the "Little Congress" of the ARMM.

History
A Regional Assembly was created form ARMM as part of Republic Act No. 6734, otherwise known as the Organic Act for the Autonomous Region in Muslim Mindanao, with the scope and limitations of the Assembly is defined in the Article VII. The 1st ARMM Regional Assembly was elected on February 12, 1990, to serve a three-year term, starting June 30, 1990. The first speaker was Ismael Abubakar Jr.

Elections were held separately from the Philippine general elections from 1990 to 2008, when President Benigno Aquino III decided to suspend the Autonomous Region in Muslim Mindanao, and synchronized it with the Philippine general election, 2013. Officers in charge were appointed until the elections on May 13, 2013.

Composition
Unlike Provincial Boards, where the Vice Governor heads the legislature, the ARMM Regional Legislative Assembly is headed separately by a Speaker which was the third highest-ranking official of the ARMM government. It is composed of three members for every congressional district. The current membership is 24, where 6 are from Lanao del Sur including Marawi City, 6 from Maguindanao, 6 from Sulu, 3 from Basilan and 3 from Tawi-Tawi.

Regular members (3 members/district) and sectoral representatives, have 3-year terms; maximum of 3 consecutive terms.

The Assembly exercises legislative power in the autonomous region, except on the following matters: foreign affairs, national defense and security, postal service, coinage and fiscal and monetary policies, administration of justice, quarantine, customs and tariff, citizenship, naturalization, immigration and deportation, general auditing, national elections, maritime, land and air transportation, communications, patents, trademarks, trade names and copyrights, foreign trade. It may also legislate on matters covered by the Shari’ah, the law governing Muslims.

See also
Autonomous Region in Muslim Mindanao
Bangsamoro Parliament

References

 
Legislatures of country subdivisions
Legislatures of the Philippines
2019 disestablishments in the Philippines